Eva Kurowski (born 1965 in Oberhausen) is a German jazz musician and singer.

Life
Kurowski's father, Walter, is a jazz musician and plays in many clubs in the Ruhr Valley, (K-14 in Oberhausen, Blue-Note in Eisenheim), and therefore his daughter was constantly exposed to jazz from an early age.

She currently tours the Ruhr area with her jazz band.

Her book "Avanti Popoloch: Eine sozialistische Kindheit im Ruhrgebiet" was published in 2008.

Music
Kurowski writes her own music and words, based in a classical jazz sound. Her female perspective in her songs is influenced by daily life in the Ruhr Valley, and alternates between pop, children's songs and jazz.

Discography
 Reich ohne Geld (Empire Without Money) (2002, Roof-Music)

References

External links
 Official site of Eva Kurowski
 Biography at Fischer Verlage

1965 births
Living people
People from Oberhausen
German jazz singers